Alan Edmundo Jara Urzola (born 17 July 1957) is a Colombian civil engineer, and current Governor of the Department of Meta. He was kidnapped by the Revolutionary Armed Forces of Colombia (FARC) on July 15, 2001, and remained in captivity until he was released on February 3, 2009.

References

1957 births
Living people
People from Bogotá
Politicians from Bogotá
Colombian civil engineers
Governors of Meta Department
Kidnapped Colombian people